Business News (formerly WA Business News) is an independently owned business media organisation which provides a digital news service and fortnightly business magazine. Established in 1992 and based in Perth, Western Australia, their twice daily business alerts reach 45,000 email addresses and the magazine has a total fortnightly circulation of 11,100 and readership of 28,280.
Originally founded by Harry Kleyn and his business partners Vanguard Press as a fortnightly free circulation newspaper.  In 2000, after finding new investors, the paper developed a digital edition and changed to weekly circulation. The new investors were represented on the operational side by Elton Swarts, the current Executive Chairman. The Editorial Department was also expanded.  Business News moved to a subscription model in 2002.

The newspaper publishes the Book of Lists, an annual business listing for Western Australia, two free Daily Business Alert emails delivered at 7.00am and 4.00pm, as well as organising a number of events such as the 40under40 Awards, an awards program for young business achievers and the Rising Stars Awards, a program for Western Australia's fastest-growing, private companies. Business News also hosts the Success & Leadership breakfast series throughout the year, featuring highly regarded Western Australian business leaders, speaking about their own professional and personal journey of success, and the "Politics & Policy" series breakfasts, featuring politicians from both sides of the political spectrum.

In 2013, the company re-branded to the new Business News name and expanded its pay wall around the digital assets. Subscribers have complete access to the web site, article archive and the most complete database on Western Australian companies and business people. Registered users can view up to 8 articles a month in a metered model before the pay wall kicks in.

Business News also produces a weekly podcast, Mark My Words, featuring both previous editors, Mark Pownall and Mark Beyer, discussing the business news of the previous week, along with a daily podcast that wraps the news of the day, At Close of Business.

In 2020, Business News hired its first new editor in 20 years, as part of an ambitious plan to triple its subscription revenue by increasing its editorial offerings. It announced in March 2021 the size of its editorial budget had increased by 78 per cent over the previous three years, while subscription revenue was up by 53 per cent and advertising revenue up by 145 per cent in the same period. Events revenue almost tripled.

Awards
In 2003, the newspaper won a Bronze Award at the Alliance of Area Business Publications Editorial Excellence Awards. In 2005, Business News subsequently won the Bronze Award for Small Business Tabloid and Best Scoop. In 2007, it won the Gold Award for Best Special Section Design and in 2008, the Silver Award for Best Front Page.  Most recently in 2015, the paper won the Bronze Award for Best Daily E-Mail.

References

External links
Company website
Alliance of Area Business Publications website

1992 establishments in Australia
Biweekly magazines published in Australia
Business magazines published in Australia
Business in Australia
Economy of Western Australia
Magazines established in 1992
Magazines published in Perth, Western Australia